The 2019 LTi Printing 250 is a NASCAR Xfinity Series race held on June 8, 2019, at Michigan International Speedway in Brooklyn, Michigan. Contested over 125 laps on the  D-shaped oval, it was the 13th race of the 2019 NASCAR Xfinity Series season.

Background

Track
Michigan International Speedway is a moderate-banked D-shaped speedway located in Brooklyn, Michigan. The track is used primarily for NASCAR events. It is sometimes known as a "sister track" to Texas World Speedway, and was used as the basis of Auto Club Speedway. The track is owned by International Speedway Corporation. Michigan International Speedway is recognized as one of motorsports' premier facilities because of its wide racing surface and high banking (by open-wheel standards; the 18-degree banking is modest by stock car standards).

Entry list

Practice

First practice

Final practice

Qualifying

Qualifying results

Race

Summary

Stage Results

Stage One
Laps: 30

Stage Two
Laps: 30

Final Stage Results

Stage Three
Laps: 65

References

2019 in sports in Michigan
LTi Printing 250
NASCAR races at Michigan International Speedway
2019 NASCAR Xfinity Series